The 1913 Tour de France was the 11th edition of Tour de France, one of cycling's Grand Tours. The Tour began in Paris on 29 June and Stage 8 occurred on 13 July with a flat stage to Aix-en-Provence. The race finished in Paris on 27 July.

Stage 1
29 June 1913 — Paris to Le Havre,

Stage 2
2 July 1913 — Le Havre to Cherbourg-en-Cotentin,

Stage 3
4 July 1913 — Cherbourg-en-Cotentin to Brest,

Stage 4
6 July 1913 — Brest to La Rochelle,

Stage 5
8 July 1913 — La Rochelle to Bayonne,

Stage 6
10 July 1913 — Bayonne to Luchon,

Stage 7
12 July 1913 — Luchon to Perpignan,

Stage 8
14 July 1913 — Perpignan to Aix-en-Provence,

References

1913 Tour de France
Tour de France stages